Diego Diz Martínez (born 12 November 1991) is a Spanish footballer who plays as a midfielder for AC Oulu.

Career

In 2015, Diz signed for Spanish fourth division side Alondras.

In 2019, he signed for Grindavík in Iceland from Spanish third division club Rápido de Bouzas.

Before the 2020 season, he signed for Samtredia in Georgia, claiming that the football was more technical than Iceland there.

Before the 2021 season, Diz signed for Finnish team AC Oulu.

References

External links
 
 

Spanish footballers
Living people
Expatriate footballers in Georgia (country)
Expatriate footballers in Finland
AC Oulu players
Footballers from Vigo
1991 births
Association football midfielders
FC Samtredia players
Grindavík men's football players
Tercera División players
Úrvalsdeild karla (football) players
Rápido de Bouzas players
Segunda División B players
Spanish expatriates in Finland
Erovnuli Liga players
Spanish expatriates in Iceland
Spanish expatriate footballers
Expatriate footballers in Iceland